Dmitry Alekseevich Selivanov (25 March 1964 – 22 April 1989) was a Siberian rock singer. He was best known for being the guitarist for Grazhdanskaya Oborona.

History 
He first started playing music in 1979. He was a member of Grazhdanskaya Oborona and Kalinov Most and founded Industrial Architecture in June 1988.

On 22 April 1989, he visited the band A'MBE, who were rehearsing at Novosibirsk State Technical University. He said what turned out to be his last words, "Don't worry, there's more for me to do at the end of the corridor," before hanging himself from a nearby staircase. He was found dead 12 hours later. Selivanov's death is mentioned in the song "Tops and Roots" by Yegor Letov, which was released that same year; "The musician Selivanov hanged himself with a scarf".

A live cover of the Peter, Sue and Marc song "The Birds of Paradise", recorded in 1987 with Selivanov on vocals, was released on Kommunizm'''s final album, Chronicle of a Dive Bomber'', in 1990.

References

Soviet male singers
1964 births
1989 suicides
Musicians from Novosibirsk
Russian male guitarists
Suicides by hanging in the Soviet Union